Debacle: The First Decade is a compilation released by Violent Femmes in 1990.

Track listing

Personnel
Violent Femmes
Gordon Gano – vocals, guitar
Brian Ritchie – bass, vocals
Victor DeLorenzo – drums, vocals

Charts

References

Violent Femmes compilation albums
1990 compilation albums
Slash Records compilation albums